is a Japanese professional baseball outfielder for the Chicago Cubs of Major League Baseball (MLB). He has previously played in Nippon Professional Baseball (NPB) for the Hiroshima Toyo Carp. Suzuki is a five-time NPB All-Star, six-time NPB Best Nine Award winner, and a five-time winner of the NPB Golden Glove Award.  Seiya Suzuki is the 3rd Cubs player in the last 100 seasons to start his career with an 8-game hit streak,  joining Andy Pafko (9 in 1943) and Joe Munson (8 in 1925).
He's the 2nd Japanese player with an 8-game hit streak to begin his MLB career.

Professional career

Hiroshima Toyo Carp 
The Hiroshima Toyo Carp drafted Suzuki in the second round of the 2012 NPB draft. He was mainly a pitcher during his high school career and was drafted as such, but switched to an infielder upon joining the team. Suzuki was given #51 as his uniform number.

Suzuki made his NPB debut on September 14, 2013, at the age of 19 and appeared in 11 games, spending most of the season in the farm system.

Suzuki continued to spend most of the 2014 season in the farm system, playing 36 games with a batting average of .344, an on-base percentage of .382, and a slugging percentage of .500.

Prior to the 2015 season, the Carp changed Suzuki's position designation from an infielder to an outfielder. Suzuki started the season with a spot on the opening day starting lineup, and eventually played in 97 games, hitting 5 home runs with a batting average of .275, an on-base percentage of .329, and a slugging percentage of .403.

2016 
Suzuki couldn't make the 2016 opening day roster due to a hamstring strain he suffered during spring training, and returned to the team on April 5. Suzuki made his first NPB All-Star Series appearance this year,  recording his first hit on the 1st game of the series, and his first RBI on the 2nd. Suzuki led the team in batting average (.335), home runs (29) and OPS (1.016), winning the Gold Glove Award and the Best Nine Award. He had also helped drive the Carp to their first pennant in twenty five years.

2017 
Suzuki made his second consecutive All-Star appearance, receiving the most votes among Central League outfielders. On August 23, Suzuki left the game due to an ankle injury. Six days later, the Carp announced that he underwent surgery to treat a malleolar fracture on his right tibia and a deltoid ligament injury, ending his 2017 season. He finished the season batting .300/.389/.547 with 26 home runs, 90 RBIs and 16 stolen bases, and led the Central League with a .936 OPS.

End of the season awards for Suzuki included his second consecutive Gold Glove Award and Best Nine Award.

2018 
On April 4, 2018, Suzuki was removed from the roster after experiencing muscle stiffness in his lower body. He was reactivated on the 18th. Suzuki was named for his third consecutive NPB All-Star Series, and marked his first All-Star game home run off of Yusei Kikuchi.

Suzuki finished the season batting .320/.438/.618, with 30 home runs and 94 RBIs. The Carp won their third consecutive Central League pennant that year, and went on to face the Fukuoka Softbank Hawks in the Japan Series. While his team lost the series, Suzuki hit 10-for-22 (.455) with 3 home runs and 6 RBIs during the Japan Series.

Suzuki won his third consecutive Best Nine Award. On November 19, the team announced that Suzuki's uniform number would be changed to #1.

2019 
Suzuki was named for his fourth consecutive NPB All-Star Series after receiving the most votes among all Central League players. On July 13, he won the 2019 NPB Home Run Derby, defeating Orix Buffaloes outfielder Masataka Yoshida 4-3 in the final round.

For the season, Suzuki appeared in a career-high 140 games, leading the NPB in batting average (.335), OBP (.453), OPS (1.018) with 112 runs scored (1st in the Central League), 28 home runs (9th), 87 RBIs (9th), 25 stolen bases (4th). After the season, Suzuki was awarded his fourth consecutive Best Nine Award and his third Gold Glove.

2020 
In the COVID-19-affected 2020 season, Suzuki played in 118 games for Hiroshima, slashing .300/.409/.544 with 25 home runs and 75 RBI. Following the season, Suzuki was awarded his fourth career Central League Golden Glove Award and his fifth career Best Nine Award.

2021 
In 2021, Suzuki played in 132 games for the Carp, setting a career-high in home runs, with 38, to go along with 88 RBI and a .317/.433/.636 slash line. Suzuki was the Central League batting champion and on-base percentage leader, and was named a NPB All-Star for the fifth time in his career. He was also awarded his fifth career Central League Golden Glove Award and sixth career, and sixth straight Best Nine Award.

Chicago Cubs 
Following the 2021 season, on November 22, 2021, Suzuki was posted by Hiroshima and made available to all 30 Major League Baseball (MLB) teams, opening a 30-day period to negotiate a contract. However, due to the 2021–22 MLB lockout, Suzuki's 30-day posting window was paused. On March 18, 2022, Suzuki officially agreed to a five-year contract worth $85 million. He went  .235/ .350 / .558 with 2 home runs, 4 hits, and 10 total bases during the 2022 Spring Training. Suzuki made his Cubs debut on April 7, 2022, working a full-count walk against Corbin Burnes in his first MLB plate appearance. He was the first Cub to make their MLB debut as an Opening Day starter since Kosuke Fukudome in 2008. Suzuki collected his first major league hit in the 5th inning of that game, a line drive single to shallow left field off of Burnes. On April 10, he hit his first major league home run, a three-run shot off of Milwaukee starter Freddy Peralta. Suzuki was awarded the National League Player of the Week award for April 11-17, a span in which he batted .412 (7-17) with 5 runs, 3 home runs, 5 RBI, and an OPS of 1.604. Suzuki was also named the NL Rookie of the Month for April. He injured his left ring finger while stealing second base on May 26 against the Cincinnati Reds and was placed on the 10-day injured list (IL). After three injury rehabilitation games with Iowa, he returned for the first time in 39 days on July 4 against the Milwaukee Brewers.

International career 
Suzuki represented the Japan national baseball team in the 2017 World Baseball Classic and 2019 WBSC Premier12.

On October 1, 2019, he was selected at the 2019 WBSC Premier12. He was named the tournament MVP, after leading the tournament with a .478 batting average, .567 OBP, 1.130 slugging percentage, two triples, 9 runs, and 12 RBIs and tying for the lead with 11 hits and three home runs.

On June 16, 2021, he was selected to Team Japan for the 2020 Summer Olympics.

Player profile
Suzuki is a 5 ft 11 in, 182 lb (1.80 m, 82 kg) outfielder that is considered a five-tool player due to his high batting averages, home run totals, baserunning, fielding abilities, and throwing abilities. He posted a career .315 batting average in NPB and won the league's batting title in 2019 with a .335 average. In his final five seasons with Hiroshima, Suzuki hit at least 25 home runs, including a career-high 38 in 2021. A month into his rookie season with Chicago, Suzuki averaged a 28.6 feet per second sprint speed, ranking 12th in the major leagues at the time and first among right fielders. Suzuki also pitched while in high school, reaching 92 miles per hour (148 km/h) on his fastball.

Suzuki has received player comparisons to A. J. Pollock as well as Mike Trout, the latter of which he chose his jersey number 27 in honor of.

Personal life
Suzuki married former Olympic rhythmic gymnast Airi Hatakeyama on December 7, 2019.

He went to the same middle school as Japanese actress Seika Furuhata, and knew each other through a mutual friend.

Career statistics

Hitting

Fielding

References

External links

 Career statistics - NPB.jp

1994 births
Living people
Hiroshima Toyo Carp players
Chicago Cubs players
Nippon Professional Baseball outfielders
Major League Baseball outfielders
Baseball people from Tokyo
2017 World Baseball Classic players
2019 WBSC Premier12 players
Baseball players at the 2020 Summer Olympics
Olympic baseball players of Japan
Olympic medalists in baseball
Olympic gold medalists for Japan
Medalists at the 2020 Summer Olympics